Highwic is a 19th-century house in Auckland, New Zealand, which is listed by Heritage New Zealand as a Category I structure. The house was built in 1862 for Alfred Buckland, a wealthy colonial settler and landowner. The building sits in an elevated position above Newmarket.

Origin and construction 

Highwic is a large house of Carpenter Gothic design that was built for a wealthy colonial settler and landowner, Alfred Buckland. The building was erected in an elevated position looking out over the township of Newmarket. In 1861, the land was purchased by Alfred's first wife Eliza for £1,000. The family with seven children, moved into the house in 1862. Eliza Buckland had two more children during her short time alive in her new house, she died of pneumonia in July 1866. The original eight room house was extended in 1874, 1883 and 1884 as the Buckland family grew bigger and their wealth increased.

Alfred Buckland married Matilda Jane Frodsham in May 1867. Matilda was twenty years younger than Alfred and went on to have eleven children of her own, nine of them surviving to adulthood. Matilda outlived Alfred, spending her declining years at Highiwc.

The building included a ballroom, seven bedrooms, a boy's dormitory, a laundry, kitchen, scullery, outside stables, grooms accommodation, a billiard house, and a service yard. By the early 20th century two inside bathrooms were added with baths, hand basins, flushing toilets and hot and cold water on tap! Family descendants who lived in the house until 1978 made alterations of their own. The property was then jointly purchased by the New Zealand Historic Places Trust (now Heritage New Zealand) and Auckland City Council to save the site from subdivision. Highwic was opened as a historic house museum in 1981.

Functions and celebrations 

A reception for the Duke of Kent and Katharine, Duchess of Kent was held at Highwic in 1980. There was also a ball to aid the New Zealand Blood Foundation in 1982. The ball generated a substantial article in the New Zealand Woman's Weekly magazine.

The Twelve Days of Christmas 

In 1985, an exhibition known as "The Twelve Days of Christmas" involved Christmas items such as Christmas decorations, Christmas cards, Christmas trees, Christmas carol singing, floral arrangements and wreaths in addition to antique dolls and toys. There was also a display explaining Christmas legends and symbolism, as well as a gift shop. One of the large Norfolk Island Pine trees in the grounds was covered with eight hundred lights. On a few occasions, there were also candlelit rooms.

150th anniversary 

In 2012, year-long celebrations were planned to celebrate the 150th anniversary of the building including high tea at the house, seeing a collection of Victorian era costumes and floral arrangements as part of the Festival of Flowers plus music and arts. That year, Highwic became the main attraction of several Auckland Heritage Festival events. The concert A Song Without Words celebrated the work of students of Felix Mendelssohn in the ballroom.

Filming 

The building has been used in filming for music acts such as Bic Runga, Rhys Darby, and also television shows such as The Jono Project.

Claimed hauntings 

Highwic is considered to be one of the “spookiest” places in Auckland as there have been claimed sightings of a ghost in a bedroom. It is also said to be the home to a ghostly canine. A spokeswoman claimed that a black dog has been seen running across the garden to the property's boundary.

References 

Historic house museums in New Zealand
Reportedly haunted locations in New Zealand
Museums in Auckland
Heritage New Zealand Category 1 historic places in the Auckland Region
Carpenter Gothic houses
1860s architecture in New Zealand
Wooden buildings and structures in New Zealand
Historic homes in New Zealand
Buckland family